The 2001 Rallye Sanremo (formally the 43rd Rallye Sanremo - Rallye d'Italia) was the eleventh round of the 2001 World Rally Championship. The race was held over three days between 5 October and 7 October 2001, and was won by Peugeot's Gilles Panizzi, his 3rd win in the World Rally Championship.

Background

Entry list

Itinerary
All dates and times are CEST (UTC+2).

Results

Overall

World Rally Cars

Classification

Special stages

Championship standings

FIA Cup for Production Rally Drivers

Classification

Special stages

Championship standings
Bold text indicates 2001 World Champions.

FIA Cup for Super 1600 Drivers

Classification

Special stages

Championship standings

References

External links 
 Official website of the World Rally Championship

Rallye Sanremo
Rallye Sanremo